Black Creek is a  tributary of the Savannah River. It is located in Effingham and Chatham counties in the Greater Savannah Area, Georgia.

Footnotes

See also
 Interstate 95 in Georgia
 Savannah, Georgia
 Savannah River

Rivers of Georgia (U.S. state)
Tributaries of the Savannah River
Rivers of Effingham County, Georgia
Rivers of Ben Hill County, Georgia
Rivers of Chatham County, Georgia